Jack Sherwood (born 17 February 1991) is a footballer with the Kerry senior football team. He has played with Kerry at all levels from minor to senior. He then moved on to the Under 21 team and played in the Munster final in 2012 but lost out to Cork. Following on from his displays with the Under 21 team he moved on to the Junior team where he won Munster and All Ireland titles.

Honours 
Firies
 Kerry Junior Football Championship (1): 2022 (c)

East Kerry
 Kerry Senior Football Championship (3): 2019, 2020, 2022

Kerry
 Munster Minor Football Championship (2): 2008, 2009
 Munster Junior Football Championship (1): 2012
 All-Ireland Junior Football Championship (1): 2012
 Munster Senior Football Championship (4): 2013, 2014, 2015, 2019
 All-Ireland Senior Football Championship (1): 2014
 Kerry Senior Football Championship (2): 2019, 2020

References

External links 
 Terracetalk.com

Living people
Firies Gaelic footballers
Kerry inter-county Gaelic footballers
1991 births